Liphook railway station serves the large village of Liphook, in Hampshire, England. It is on the Portsmouth Direct Line,  down the line from  via Woking. The station is managed by South Western Railway, who operate all trains serving it.

History 
In 2020, South Western Railway was issued with an improvement notice by the Office of Rail and Road as it did not supply a ramp for wheelchair users despite it being mandated by law.

In August 2020, planning permission was given to replace the station footbridge. In January 2021, work began to replace the footbridge with a new covered bridge with lifts. The new bridge was opened in September 2021 with the lifts opened shortly after.

Services
All services at Liphook are operated by South Western Railway using  and  EMUs.

The typical off-peak service in trains per hour is:
 1 tph to  via 
 1 tph to 

References

External links

National Rail website
Former Bordon station

Railway stations in Hampshire
DfT Category D stations
Former London and South Western Railway stations
Railway stations in Great Britain opened in 1859
Railway stations served by South Western Railway